George Jones (1931–2013) was an American country music singer and songwriter.

George Jones may also refer to:

Politicians
George Jones (British politician) (1874–1956), Conservative MP for Stoke Newington 1918–1923, 1924–1945
George Jones (Newfoundland politician) (1867–1949), Newfoundland mariner, magistrate and politician
George Jones (U.S. senator) (1766–1838), American senator from Georgia
George Wallace Jones (1804–1896), American senator from Iowa
George Washington Jones (Tennessee politician) (1806–1884), American representative from Tennessee
George Washington Jones (Texas politician) (1828–1903), American representative from Texas
George Jones (New Zealand politician) (1844–1920), New Zealand politician
George Jones (Australian politician) (1866–1938), New South Wales politician
George Burpee Jones (1866–1950), Canadian merchant and politician
George R. Jones, president of the Massachusetts Senate (1903–1904)
George Hall Jones, member of the Queensland Legislative Assembly, Australia

Sportsmen
George Jones (footballer, born 1889) (1889–1969), English footballer who played for Southampton
George Jones (footballer, born 1895) (1895–1970), English footballer for Everton, Wigan Borough and Southport
George Jones (footballer, born 1918) (1918–1995), English footballer who played for Sheffield United
George Jones (footballer, born 1930), Welsh footballer who played for Wrexham
George Jones (footballer, born 1945), English footballer who played for Bury
George Jones (American football) (born 1973), American running back, played for the Pittsburgh Steelers, Jacksonville Jaguars and Cleveland Browns, 1997–1999
George Jones (Hampshire cricketer) (1907–1953), Scottish cricketer
George Jones (Surrey cricketer) (1856–1936), English cricketer
George Jones (sport shooter), British Olympic shooter

Others
George Jones (navy chaplain) (1800–1870), American Navy chaplain and participant in 1852 Perry Expedition to Japan
George Jones (1810–1879), English-born American actor and eccentric later known as George, Count Joannes
George Jones (RAAF officer) (1896–1992), Royal Australian Air Force
George Jones (painter) (1786–1869), Royal Academy keeper, war painter
George Jones (publisher) (1811–1891), co-founder of the New York Times
George W. Jones (printer) (1860–1942), printer and type designer
George Jones (radio presenter) (born 1944), radio and TV personality, founder member of Clubsound, Belfast
George Jones (Canadian admiral) (1895–1946), Canadian admiral
George Cecil Jones (1873–1960), Welsh chemist and occultist
George Heber Jones (1867–1919), American missionary in Korea
George Henry Jones (1884–1956), British trade unionist and politician
George Howell Jones (1887–1950), American architect
George Jones, blues musician better known as Little Hat Jones
George 'Wydell' Jones, member of the Edsels
George Jones (journalist), former political editor of The Telegraph
George Fleming Jones, American diplomat
George Fowler Jones (1818–1905), British architect
George L. Jones (1918–1997), Korean War flying ace
George Lamar Jones (1945–2012), American serial killer
George Jones (bishop) (died 1804), Irish Anglican bishop of Kilmore and of Kildare
George M. Jones (1911–1996), American Army brigadier general
George Noble Jones (1811–1876), American plantation owner
George Neville Jones (1903–1970), English-born botanist
George William Jones (1938–2017), professor of government at the London School of Economics
George Jones (bushranger) (1815–1844), Australian bushranger
George Hilton Jones III (1924–2008), American historian, professor and author
G. Lewis Jones (1907–1971), American ambassador